KVOV (90.5 FM) is a radio station licensed to Carbondale, Colorado. The station is owned by Colorado Public Radio (CPR), and airs CPR's "Classical Music" network, originating from KVOD in Denver, Colorado.

Translators
The station's signal is relayed by the following translator stations.

External links
cpr.org

VOV
VOV
Classical music radio stations in the United States
NPR member stations
Radio stations established in 1964